The Nottingham Astronomical Society was established in 1946.

History
There is some evidence for a society for people interested in astronomy in the Nottingham area in the nineteen-twenties.

The society owns a 24" reflecting telescope housed in a dome observatory near Cotgrave, Nottinghamshire. 

Since 1980 the society has been twinned with the Karlruhe Astronomical Society (Astronomischen Vereinigung Karlsruhe, AOD) based in Germany.

See also
 List of astronomical societies

References

External links
 official site

British astronomy organisations
Clubs and societies in Nottinghamshire
Rushcliffe
Science and technology in Nottinghamshire